International Aikido Federation (International Aikido Federation) is a world governing body for the sport of Aikido.

Structure
The International Aikido Federation was formed in 1976 to serve as a primary global aikido organisation. It is an umbrella organisation with member organisations from more than 40 nations (for example, the All-Japan Aikido Federation is one member). All members must be recognised by the Hombu, so the IAF exclusively represents the Aikikai school. The IAF is a nominally democratic organisation but special roles are given to the Doshu and a council of senior instructors, to safeguard the "technical and moral" integrity of aikido. The IAF currently admits only one member organisation per country and gives each such member equal vote (it was modeled on the UN; it does not necessarily give every Aikikai student equal representation).

The IAF demonstrates aikido at the World Games, and represents aikido to the globe. The IAF also organises International Aikido Congresses every four years, facilitating direct training between aikido students of different countries, sharing instruction by the world's most senior aikido instructors, and also providing a channel for official communication with the Hombu.

The IAF publishes a list of member nations and organisations.

Chairs

 Guy Bonnefond (1974-1984)
 Giorgio Veneri (1984-1996)
 Peter Goldsbury (1996-2016)
Peter Goldsbury is also a Professor of comparative mythology at Hiroshima and he has published a large body of aikido articles over his many years of practice. In early 2016, Peter Goldsbury announced his retirement and he officially stepped down following the elections that took place during the 12th IAF Congress held in September 2016 in the city of Takasaki (Gunma Prefecture, Japan).
 Kei Izawa (2016-)
Kei Izawa previously served as the IAF's General Secretary and he has also the translated in English the biography of Morihei Ueshiba written by his son, Kisshomaru Ueshiba.

Events

International Aikido Federation Congress
Every four years, the IAF holds a Congress in Japan where delegations from all member countries gather for a week of practice under the direction of numerous high ranked instructors, both Japanese and foreign. Along the seminar are held directing committee meetings as well as elections. The last congress took place in the city of Takasaki (Gunma) in September 2016.

Other Events
The IAF was represented at both of SportAccord's World Combat Games that took place in China and Russia in 2010 and 2013, respectively.

See also

References

External links
 
 
 
 

International sports organizations
Aikido organizations
Sports organizations established in 1976